The 2018–19 Liga Puerto Rico season, is the league's inaugural season of Liga Puerto Rico.

Summary
Following the absence of a football league in Puerto Rico for the 2017–18 season, the Puerto Rican Football Federation organized a Preparatory Tournament that ran from March until June 2018. 10 teams participated on the tournament won by Bayamón FC.

The league's launch conference was held on August 23, 2018. The league kicked off on September 29, 2018.

Teams

Regular season

Standings

Positions by round
The table lists the positions of teams after each week of matches. In order to preserve chronological evolvements, any postponed matches are not included in the round at which they were originally scheduled, but added to the full round they were played immediately afterwards. For example, if a match is scheduled for matchday 13, but then postponed and played between days 16 and 17, it will be added to the standings for day 16.

Results

Week 1

Week 2

Week 3

Week 4

Week 5

Week 6

Week 7

Week 8

Week 9

Week 10

Week 11

Week 12

Week 13

Week 14

Week 15

Week 16

Week 17

Week 18

Week 19

Week 20

Week 21

Playoffs

Quarterfinals Leg 1

Quarterfinals Leg 2

Semifinals Leg 1

Semifinals Leg 2

Final

Season statistics

Scoring
First goal of the season:   Antonio Enright for Metropolitan FA against Don Bosco FC (29 September 2018)
100th goal of the season:   Josep Becerra for Bayamón FC against Caguas Sporting FC (27 November 2018)
200th goal of the season:   Rubén Jordan for Guaynabo Gol against Bayamón FC (27 January 2019)
300th goal of the season:   Jorge Rivera for Don Bosco FC against Caguas Sporting FC (10 March 2019)

Top goalscorers 

Source Liga Puerto Rico

Top assists 

Assist until matches played at January 20, 2019

Clean Sheets

References

External links
Puerto Rico 2018/19, RSSSF.com

Liga Puerto Rico
Puerto Rico
Liga
Liga